Wilfred Russell Bailey, 3rd Baron Glanusk (27 June 1891 – 12 January 1948), was a British peer and soldier.

Career
Glanusk was the son of Joseph Bailey, 2nd Baron Glanusk, born on 17 June 1891. He followed his father into the Grenadier Guards and served in World War I, being wounded twice, Mentioned in dispatches, and awarded the DSO and Bar and the French Croix de guerre. He reached the rank of Major.

He succeeded his father as third Baron on 11 January 1928, and also followed him as Lord Lieutenant of Brecknockshire and Honorary Colonel
of the 3rd (Brecknockshire & Monmouthshire) Battalion, Monmouthshire Regiment in the Territorial Army.

He served again in World War II, as Lieutenant-Colonel of the Welsh Guards 1939–42, and then as a Colonel at General Headquarters, Home Forces. After the war he continued as Hon Colonel of 638th (Brecknock) Light Anti-Aircraft Regiment, Royal Artillery, successors to the 3rd Bn Monmouths.

Family
On 27 February 1919, while still the Hon Wilfred Bailey, Glanusk married firstly Victoria Mary Enid Ann Dugdale, a daughter of Lt-Col Frank Dugdale and Eva Sarah Louise Greville. They were divorced in 1939. On 17 March 1942 he married secondly Margaret Eldrydd Shoubridge, daughter of Major-General Herbert Shoubridge. They had a daughter, the Hon Elizabeth Shân Josephine Bailey (born 10 September 1943).

Glanusk died in January 1948, aged 56, and having no son was succeeded in his peerage by a first cousin, David Russell Bailey.

Glanusk left his ancestral home and estate of Glanusk Park to his daughter, Dame Elizabeth Shân Legge-Bourke, DCVO, who in 1998 became Lord Lieutenant of Powys.

In 1966 Glanusk’s widow married William Sidney, 1st Viscount De L'Isle, recently returned from serving as Governor-General of Australia. She died in 2002.

Coat of arms

Notes

References
 Burke's Peerage, Baronetage and Knightage, 100th Edn, London, 1953.
Kidd, Charles, Williamson, David (editors). Debrett's Peerage and Baronetage (1990 edition). New York: St Martin's Press, 1990 

1891 births
1948 deaths
Barons in the Peerage of the United Kingdom
Grenadier Guards officers
Welsh Guards officers
Lord-Lieutenants of Brecknockshire
Welsh landowners